The Journal of Speculative Philosophy is an academic journal that examines basic philosophical questions, the interaction between Continental and American philosophy, and the relevance of historical philosophers to contemporary thinkers. The journal is published quarterly by the Penn State University Press.

History
An unrelated journal by the same name was established in 1867 by William Torrey Harris of St. Louis, Missouri, becoming the first journal on philosophy in the English-speaking world. The journal ceased publication in 1893, but the name was revived in 1987 at the Pennsylvania State University with the founding of the Journal of Speculative Philosophy.

References

External links 
 
Journal of Speculative Philosophy on the Penn State Press website
Journal of Speculative Philosophy at Project MUSE

English-language journals
Penn State University Press academic journals
Publications established in 1987
Philosophy journals
Quarterly journals